The  is a yakuza group based in Hiroshima, Japan. The Kyodo-kai is a designated yakuza group with an estimated 80 active members. and is the second largest yakuza group in the Chugoku region after the Kyosei-kai.

History
Kokichi Morita, then the highest-ranked senior member of the Takahashi-gumi, formed the Kyodo-kai in January 1969 following the Takahashi-gumi's disbanding. Kokichi Morita's younger brother Kazuo Morita succeeded as president in November 1989. The Kyodo-kai was registered as a designated yakuza group under the Organized Crime Countermeasures Law in 1993.

Condition
Based in Onomichi, Hiroshima, the Kyodo-kai has its known offices in five other prefectures including Okayama and Kagawa.

Since 1996, the Kyodo-kai has been a member of an anti-Yamaguchi federation named the Gosha-kai, along with three other Chugoku-based organizations, the Kyosei-kai, the Asano-gumi, the Goda-ikka, and the Shikoku-based Shinwa-kai.

Involvement in Politics
The founder Tokujiro Takahashi was also a politician. He was elected to Onomichi City Council in April 1951 and allegedly later became Onomichi's most influential figure. He was eventually elected to Hiroshima Prefectural Council in December 1955, and had been a member of the council until December 1967 when he was arrested for illegal baseball-gambling.

References

Organizations established in 1945
1945 establishments in Japan
Yakuza groups